Retrospektivt collage is the first compilation album by Swedish pop rock musician Magnus Uggla. It was released in December 1985 and produced by Anders Henriksson and Uggla.

Track listing
 "Varning på stan" - 4:41
 "Centrumhets" (Metro Jets) - 4:05
 "IQ" - 3:33
 "Trendit, trendit" - 3:52
 "Mälarö kyrka" - 3:05
 "Hallå" - 3:08
 "Johnny the Rucker" - 4:50
 "Sommartid" - 4:46
 "Hand i hand" - 4:41
 "Skandal bjotis" - 4:09
 "Vittring" - 3:09
 "Jag skiter" - 3:25
 "Jag vill inte gå hit" - 3:26
 "Ge livet en chans" - 3:26
 "Asfaltbarn" - 2:33
 "Astrologen" - 5:15
 "Retrospektivt collage" - 8:21
 "Tjena Allena" - 0:29
The first LP edition had the bonus songs "Retrospektivt collage (short version)" and "Retrospektivt collage (different mix)".

Charts

References 

1985 compilation albums
Magnus Uggla compilation albums
Swedish-language compilation albums